Gorshkovo is the name of several rural localities in Russia.

Ivanovo Oblast
As of 2012, four rural localities in Ivanovo Oblast bear this name:
 Gorshkovo, Ivanovsky District, Ivanovo Oblast, a village in Ivanovsky District
 Gorshkovo (Cherntskoye Rural Settlement), Lezhnevsky District, Ivanovo Oblast, a village in Lezhnevsky District; municipally, a part of Cherntskoye Rural Settlement of that district
 Gorshkovo (Sabinovskoye Rural Settlement), Lezhnevsky District, Ivanovo Oblast, a village in Lezhnevsky District; municipally, a part of Sabinovskoye Rural Settlement of that district
 Gorshkovo, Privolzhsky District, Ivanovo Oblast, a village in Privolzhsky District

Kaluga Oblast
As of 2012, one rural locality in Kaluga Oblast bears this name:
 Gorshkovo, Kaluga Oblast, a village in Sukhinichsky District

Kostroma Oblast
As of 2012, one rural locality in Kostroma Oblast bears this name:
 Gorshkovo, Kostroma Oblast, a village in Tsentralnoye Settlement of Buysky District;

Kurgan Oblast
As of 2012, one rural locality in Kurgan Oblast bears this name:
 Gorshkovo, Kurgan Oblast, a village in Kipelsky Selsoviet of Shumikhinsky District;

Moscow Oblast
As of 2012, three rural localities in Moscow Oblast bear this name:
 Gorshkovo, Dmitrovsky District, Moscow Oblast, a settlement under the administrative jurisdiction of the Town of Dmitrov in Dmitrovsky District
 Gorshkovo, Istrinsky District, Moscow Oblast, a village in Luchinskoye Rural Settlement of Istrinsky District
 Gorshkovo, Yegoryevsky District, Moscow Oblast, a village under the administrative jurisdiction of the Town of Yegoryevsk in Yegoryevsky District

Nizhny Novgorod Oblast
As of 2012, one rural locality in Nizhny Novgorod Oblast bears this name:
 Gorshkovo, Nizhny Novgorod Oblast, a village under the administrative jurisdiction of the town of district significance of Knyaginino in Knyagininsky District

Republic of Tatarstan
As of 2012, one rural locality in the Republic of Tatarstan bears this name:
 Gorshkovo, Republic of Tatarstan, a selo in Novosheshminsky District

Tula Oblast
As of 2012, two rural localities in Tula Oblast bear this name:
 Gorshkovo, Venyovsky District, Tula Oblast, a village in Mordvessky Rural Okrug of Venyovsky District
 Gorshkovo, Yasnogorsky District, Tula Oblast, a selo in Burakovskaya Rural Territory of Yasnogorsky District

Tver Oblast
As of 2012, seven rural localities in Tver Oblast bear this name:
 Gorshkovo, Firovsky District, Tver Oblast, a village in Firovskoye Rural Settlement of Firovsky District
 Gorshkovo, Likhoslavlsky District, Tver Oblast, a village in Kavskoye Rural Settlement of Likhoslavlsky District
 Gorshkovo, Seletskoye Rural Settlement, Maksatikhinsky District, Tver Oblast, a village in Seletskoye Rural Settlement of Maksatikhinsky District
 Gorshkovo, Truzhenitskoye Rural Settlement, Maksatikhinsky District, Tver Oblast, a village in Truzhenitskoye Rural Settlement of Maksatikhinsky District
 Gorshkovo, Rzhevsky District, Tver Oblast, a village in Uspenskoye Rural Settlement of Rzhevsky District
 Gorshkovo, Torzhoksky District, Tver Oblast, a village in Bolshepetrovskoye Rural Settlement of Torzhoksky District
 Gorshkovo, Zubtsovsky District, Tver Oblast, a village in Vazuzskoye Rural Settlement of Zubtsovsky District

Vladimir Oblast
As of 2012, one rural locality in Vladimir Oblast bears this name:
 Gorshkovo, Vladimir Oblast, a village in Gorokhovetsky District

Vologda Oblast
As of 2012, three rural localities in Vologda Oblast bear this name:
 Gorshkovo, Ust-Kubinsky District, Vologda Oblast, a village in Troitsky Selsoviet of Ust-Kubinsky District
 Gorshkovo, Velikoustyugsky District, Vologda Oblast, a village in Mardengsky Selsoviet of Velikoustyugsky District
 Gorshkovo, Vologodsky District, Vologda Oblast, a village in Raboche-Krestyansky Selsoviet of Vologodsky District

Yaroslavl Oblast
As of 2012, two rural localities in Yaroslavl Oblast bear this name:
 Gorshkovo, Borisoglebsky District, Yaroslavl Oblast, a village in Krasnooktyabrsky Rural Okrug of Borisoglebsky District
 Gorshkovo, Nekouzsky District, Yaroslavl Oblast, a village in Rodionovsky Rural Okrug of Nekouzsky District

See also
 Gorshkov, a surname